Mifflin Township is one of the fourteen townships of Pike County, Ohio, United States.  The 2000 census found 1,194 people in the township.

Geography
Located in the southwestern corner part of the county, it borders the following townships:
Benton Township - northeast
Sunfish Township - southeast
Franklin Township, Adams County - south
Bratton Township, Adams County - southwest corner
Brushcreek Township, Highland County - west
Perry Township - northwest

No municipalities are located in Mifflin Township, although the unincorporated community of Latham lies in the eastern part of the township.

Name and history
Statewide, other Mifflin Townships are located in Ashland, Franklin, Richland, and Wyandot counties.

Government
The township is governed by a three-member board of trustees, who are elected in November of odd-numbered years to a four-year term beginning on the following January 1. Two are elected in the year after the presidential election and one is elected in the year before it. There is also an elected township fiscal officer, who serves a four-year term beginning on April 1 of the year after the election, which is held in November of the year before the presidential election. Vacancies in the fiscal officership or on the board of trustees are filled by the remaining trustees.

References

External links
Pike County visitors bureau website

Townships in Pike County, Ohio
Townships in Ohio